Oregon Route 332 (OR 332) is an Oregon state highway running from the Washington state line near Umapine to OR 11 near Milton-Freewater.  OR 332 is known as the Sunnyside-Umapine Highway No. 332 (see Oregon highways and routes).  It is approximately eight miles long and runs east–west, entirely within Umatilla County.

OR 332 was established in 2003 as part of Oregon's project to assign route numbers to highways that previously were not assigned.

Route description 

OR 332 begins at an intersection with State Line Road on the Washington state line two miles (3 km) north of Umapine and heads south and then east toward Milton-Freewater, passing through Sunnyside.  Near Milton-Freewater, OR 332 crosses OR 339 and proceeds east.  Approximately one mile north of Milton-Freewater, OR 332 ends at an intersection with OR 11.

History 

OR 332 was assigned to the Sunnyside-Umapine Highway in 2003.

Major intersections

References 

332
Transportation in Umatilla County, Oregon